Arsalan Qadir (born 15 September 1989) is a former international cricketer who played a single Twenty20 International match for the Canadian national team in 2010. He was born in Peshawar, Pakistan.

A right-arm pace bowler, Qadir played for the Canadian under-19s at the 2007 and 2009 editions of the Americas Under-19 Championship. Against the Cayman Islands under-19 side, at the 2007 tournament, he took figures of 5/6, helping to dismiss the team for only 77. At the 2009 Under-19 World Cup Qualifier, Qadir took 14 wickets from six matches, behind only Hiral Patel for Canada. This included figures of 6/44 against the United States and 4/19 against Uganda. Qadir was subsequently selected in Canada's squad for the 2010 Under-19 World Cup. However, at the tournament he managed only three wickets from his five games. The month after the Under-19 World Cup, Qadir was selected in Canada's senior squad for the 2010 World Twenty20 Qualifier in the United Arab Emirates. He played only one game, a Twenty20 International against Kenya, and failed to take a wicket, conceding 12 runs from his only over.

References

External links
Player profile and statistics at CricketArchive
Arsalan Qadir at ESPNcricinfo

1989 births
Living people
Canada Twenty20 International cricketers
Canadian cricketers
Pakistani cricketers
Pakistani emigrants to Canada
Naturalized citizens of Canada
Cricketers from Peshawar